The 2018 European Junior Badminton Championships were held at the Kalev Sports Hall in Tallinn, Estonia, between 7-16 September 2018.

Medalists

Medal table

References

External links 
Team Event
Individual Event

European Junior Badminton Championships
European Junior Badminton Championships
European Junior Badminton Championships
European Junior Badminton Championships
International sports competitions hosted by Estonia